Beelitz-Heilstätten station is a railway station in the district of Beelitz-Heilstätten which belongs to the town of Beelitz located in the district of Potsdam-Mittelmark, Brandenburg, Germany.

References

Railway stations in Brandenburg
Buildings and structures in Potsdam-Mittelmark